Shani Waugh (born 2 September 1969) is an Australian professional golfer. She played on the U.S.-based LPGA Tour and Ladies European Tour, as well as on the ALPG Tour in her home country.

Waugh turned professional in 1991 and joined the Ladies European Tour the same year. In 1997 she joined the LPGA Tour, where career highlights include finishing runner-up at the 2003 Chick-fil-A Charity Championship after a playoff with Se Ri Pak, and finishing third at the 2002 U.S. Women's Open behind Juli Inkster and Annika Sörenstam.

Waugh won three times on the LET between 1996 and 2005. After her inaugural win at Costa Azul Ladies Open, she beat Becky Brewerton into second place at the Wales WPGA Championship of Europe by holing a 74-foot birdie putt on the final green and beat Gwladys Nocera in a playoff to win Thailand Ladies Open.

Professional wins (7)

Ladies European Tour wins (3)

Ladies European Tour playoff record (1–2)

ALPG Tour wins (4)
2005 (1) Peugeot Kangaroo Valley Resort Pro-Am
2007 (2) Angostura Lemon Lime & Bitters Castle Hill Country Club Pro-Am, Mollymook Women's Classic
2008 (1) Peter Donnelly Ladies Classic

Playoff record
LPGA Tour playoff record (0–1)

Team appearances
Professional
Praia d'El Rey European Cup (representing Ladies European Tour): 1997

References

External links

Australian female golfers
ALPG Tour golfers
Ladies European Tour golfers
LPGA Tour golfers
People from Bunbury, Western Australia
1969 births
Living people